Jeb Bishop is primarily known as an improvisational jazz trombonist. However he occasionally plays other instruments on both jazz and rock recordings as noted.

As leader/co-leader
 Jeb Bishop: 98 Duets (Wobbly Rail, 1998)
 Jeb Bishop Trio: Jeb Bishop Trio (Okka Disk, 1999)
 Jeb Bishop Trio/Quartet: Afternoons (Okka Disk, 2001)
 Jeb Bishop & Sebi Tramontana: Chicago Defenders (Wobbly Rail, 2002)
 Lucky 7s: Farragut (Lakefront Digital, 2006)
 Lucky 7s: Pluto Junkyard (Clean Feed Records, 2009)
 Jeb Bishop Trio: 2009 (Better Animal Recordings, 2009)
 Jeb Bishop & Jorrit Dijkstra: 1000 Words (Driff Records, 2012)
 Jeb Bishop & Tim Daisy: Old Shoulders (Relay Recordings, 2012)
 Long Sidewalks: Staffa (Breakfast for Dinner Records, 2015)
 Jeb Bishop & Dan Ruccia: Scratch Slice Jag (Out & Gone Music, 2017)
 Jeb Bishop (solo): Three Valentines and Goodbye (1980 Records, 2018)
 Jeb Bishop Flex Quartet: Re-Collect (Not Two Records, 2019)
 Jeb Bishop, Matthias Muche: Duo (Creative Sources, 2019)
 Jeb Bishop Centrifugal Trio: Jeb Bishop Centrifugal Trio (Astral Spirits, 2020)

Collaborations
 Joe McPhee / Jeb Bishop: The Brass City (Okka Disk, 1999)
 Tony Bevan, Jeb Bishop, Michael Zerang, John Edwards: Nham (Foghorn Records, 2002)
 The Engines: The Engines (Okka Disk, 2007)
 Jeb Bishop / Harris Eisenstadt / Jason Roebke: Tiebreaker (Not Two Records, 2008)
 The Engines: Wire And Brass (Okka Disk, 2010)
 Joe McPhee, Jeb Bishop, Ingebrigt Håker Flaten, Michael Zerang: Ibsen’s Ghosts (Not Two Records, 2011)
 Jeb Bishop, Jaap Blonk, Lou Mallozzi & Frank Rosaly: At The Hideout (Kontrans, 2012)
 Rodrigo Amado Motion Trio & Jeb Bishop: Burning Live At Jazz Ao Centro (JACC Records, 2012)
 Cactus Truck With Jeb Bishop and Roy Campbell: Live In USA (Tractata Records, 2013) (trombone, electronics/fx)
 Rodrigo Amado Motion Trio + Jeb Bishop: The Flame Alphabet (Not Two Records, 2013)
 The Engines w/ John Tchicai: Other Violets (Not Two Records, 2013)
 The Engines: Green Knights (Aerophonic Records, 2015)
 Polyorchard: Color Theory in Black and White (Polyorchard, 2015)
 Polyorchard: Red October (Out & Gone Music, 2017)
 Polyorchard: Sextet / Quintet (Out & Gone Music, 2018)
 Polyorchard (Jeb Bishop and David Menestres): Ink (Out & Gone Music, 2020)
 Matthias Muche / Matthias Müller / Jeb Bishop: Konzert für Hannes (Not Two Records, 2017)
 The Diagonal: Filter (Not Two Records, 2018)
 Jeb Bishop / Weasel Walter / Alex Ward: Flayed (ugEXPLODE, 2019)

As sideman

With Atomic (band) / School Days
 Nuclear Assembly Hall (Okka Disk, 2004)
 Distil (Okka Disk, 2008)

With Bathysphere
 Bathysphere (Driff Records, 2015)

With Bonaventure Pencroff
 De Fortune (Mz Records, 2014)

With Peter Brötzmann
 Peter Brötzmann, The Chicago Octet / Tentet, 1 / 2 / 3 (Okka Disk, 1998)
 Peter Brötzmann Chicago Tentet, Stone/Water (Okka Disk, 2000)
 Peter Brötzmann Chicago Tentet Plus Two, Short Visit To Nowhere (Okka Disk, 2002)
 Peter Brötzmann Chicago Tentet Plus Two, Broken English (Okka Disk, 2002)
 Peter Brötzmann Chicago Tentet, Images (Okka Disk, 2004)
 Peter Brötzmann Chicago Tentet, Signs (Okka Disk, 2004)
 Peter Brötzmann Chicago Tentet Featuring Mike Pearson, Be Music, Night (Okka Disk, 2005)
 Peter Brötzmann Chicago Tentet + 1, 3 Nights In Oslo (Smalltown Superjazzz, 2010)
 Peter Brötzmann Chicago Tentet, Walk, Love, Sleep (Smalltown Superjazzz, 2012)
 Peter Brötzmann, Long Story Short (Trost Records, 2013)
 Peter Brötzmann Chicago Tentet, Concert For Fukushima Wels 2011 (PanRec/Trost Records, 2013)

With Kyle Bruckmann
 And (Musica Genera, 2001)
 Wrack (Red Toucan Records, 2003)
 Kyle Bruckmann's Wrack, ...Awaits Silent Tristero's Empire (Singlespeed Music, 2014)

With John Butcher
 Anomalies In The Customs Of The Day: Music On Seven Occasions (Meniscus, 2000)

With Chicago Edge Ensemble
 Decaying Orbit (Lizard Breath, 2017)

With Daniele D'Agaro, Jeb Bishop, Kent Kessler, Robert Barry
 Chicago Overtones (hatOLOGY, 2005)

With Darren Johnston's Gone To Chicago
 The Big Lift (Porto Franco Records, 2011)

With Bill Dixon
 Bill Dixon with Exploding Star Orchestra (Thrill Jockey, 2008)

With Harris Eisenstadt
 The Soul And Gone (482 Music, 2005)
 Old Growth Forest (Clean Feed Records, 2016)
 Recent Developments (Songlines, 2017)
 Old Growth Forest II (Astral Sprits, 2019)

With Exploding Star Orchestra
 We Are All From Somewhere Else (Thrill Jockey, 2007)
 Stars Have Shapes (Delmark Records, 2010)
 Matter Anti-Matter (RogueArt, 2014)

With The Flatlands Collective
 Gnomade (Skycap Records, 2007)
 Maatjes (Clean Feed Records, 2009)

With The Flying Luttenbachers
 Constructive Destruction (ugEXPLODE Records, 1994) (bass guitar, trombone)
 Destroy All Music (ugEXPLODE Records, 1995) (bass guitar, Casio keyboard)
 Destroy All Music Revisited (Skin Graft Records, 2007) (bass guitar, Casio keyboard)

With Frank Rosaly
 ¡Todos de Pie! (Kontrans, 2019)

With Globe Unity Orchestra
 Globe Unity - 40 Years (Intakt Records, 2008)

With Hamid Drake & Bindu
 Reggaeology (RogueArt, 2010)

With Eric Hofbauer's Five Agents
 Book of Water (Creative Nation Music, 2019)

With Jason Roebke Octet
 High/Red/Center (Delmark Records, 2014)

With Joe Harriott Project
 Straight Lines (album) (Atavistic Records, 1999)

With John Corbett & Heavy Friends
 I'm Sick About My Hat (Atavistic Records, 1999)

With Jorrit Dijkstra's Pillow Circles
 Pillow Circles (Clean Feed Records, 2010)
 Pillow Circles Live Bimhuis Amsterdam (Driff Records, 2014)

With Josh Berman & His Gang
 There Now (Delmark Records, 2012)

With Keefe Jackson Quartet
 Seeing You See (Clean Feed, 2010)

With Ken Vandermark's TOPOLOGY Nonet featuring Joe McPhee
 Impressions Of Po Music (Okka Disk, 2013)

With KLANG
 Other Doors (Allos Documents, 2011)

With The Lightbox Orchestra
 Two Lightboxes (Locust Music, 2004)

With Fred Lonberg-Holm
 Site-Specific: Duets For Cello And Guitar (Explain:, 2000)

With Mike Reed's People, Places & Things
 About Us (482 Music, 2009)
 Stories And Negotiations (482 Music, 2010)

With Paul Giallorenzo's GitGo
 Emergent (Leo Records, 2012)
 Force Majeure (Delmark Records, 2014)

With Dan Phillips Quartet
 Converging Tributaries (Lizard Breath, 2017)

With Predella Group
 Strade D'Acqua / Roads Of Water (Multikulti Project, 2011)

With Paul Rutherford
 Chicago 2002 (Emanem Records, 2002)

With School Days
 Crossing Division (Okka Disk, 2001) 
 In Our Times (Okka Disk, 2002)

With School Days And The Thing, Presented By Mats Gustafsson
 The Music Of Norman Howard (Anagram Records, 2002)

With Ted Sirota's Rebel Souls
 Breeding Resistance (Delmark Records, 2004)

With Terminal 4
 Terminal 4 (Atavistic Records / Truckstop, 2001) (trombone, guitar)
 When I'm Falling (Atavistic Records / Truckstop, 2001) (trombone, guitar)

With The TERRITORY BAND
 Territory Band-1: Transatlantic Bridge (Okka Disk, 2001)
 Territory Band-2: Atlas (Okka Disk, 2002)
 Territory Band-3: Map Theory (Okka Disk, 2004)
 Territory Band-4: Company Switch (Okka Disk, 2005)

With The Vandermark 5
 Single Piece Flow (Atavistic, 1997) (trombone, guitar)
 Every Tuesday At The Empty Bottle The Vandermark 5 Will Pour An Ocean Of Sound Into Your Bucket. Drink, Don't Drown. (Savage Sound Syndicate, 1997) (trombone, guitar)
 Target or Flag (Atavistic Records, 1998) (trombone, guitar)
 Simpatico (The Vandermark 5 album) (Atavistic Records, 1999) (trombone, guitar)
 Every Tuesday At The Empty Bottle The Battle For Supremacy Continues: The Vandermark 5 Vs. Santo, El Enmascarado De Plata - Thinking On One's Feet. (Savage Sound Syndicate, 1999) (trombone, guitar)
 Burn The Incline (Atavistic Records, 2000) (trombone, guitar)
 Acoustic Machine (Atavistic Records, 2001)
 Free Jazz Classics Vol. 1 & 2 (Atavistic Records, 2002)
 Airports For Light (Atavistic Records, 2003)
 Elements Of Style, Exercises In Surprise (Atavistic Records, 2004)
 The Color Of Memory (Atavistic Records, 2005)
 Alchemia (Not Two Records, 2005)
 Free Jazz Classics Vol. 3 & 4 (Atavistic Records, 2006)

With The Whammies
 Play The Music Of Steve Lacy (Driff Records, 2012)
 Play The Music Of Steve Lacy Vol. 2 (Driff Records, 2013)
 Play The Music Of Steve Lacy Vol. 3, Live (Driff Records, 2014)

With Zu (band)
 Igneo (Wide Records, 2002)

Rock collaborations
 Metal Pitcher: A Careful Workman Is The Best Safety Device (7") (Merge Records, 1989) (drums)
 The Angels of Epistemology: The Angels of Epistemology (EP) (Merge Records, 1991) (guitar, bass, vocals, keyboard)
 The Angels of Epistemology: Fruit (Merge Records, 1995) (guitar, bass, other strings, vocals, keyboard, trombone)

As rock/pop/electronic sideman

With Olivia Block
 Pure Gaze (Sedimental Records, 1999)
 Change Ringing (Cut Records, 2005)

With Cheer-Accident
 Enduring The American Dream (Pravda, 1997)
 Salad Days (Skin Graft, 2000)

With Gastr Del Sol
 The Harp Factory on Lake Street (Table of the Elements, 1995)
 Camoufleur (Drag City, 1998)

With In Zenith
 Building A Better Future (Miguel Recordings, 1998) (trombone, guitar, bass)

With Markéta Irglová
 ANAR (Markéta Irglová, 2011)

With Simon Joyner
 The Lousy Dance (Truckstop, 1999)

With Mount Moriah
 How to Dance (Mount Moriah, 2016)

With Chris Mills (musician)
 The Silver Line (Powerless Pop Recorders, 2002)

With Rian Murphy & Will Oldham
 All Most Heaven (Drag City, 2000)

With Jim O'Rourke (musician)
 Bad Timing (Drag City, 1997)
 Eureka (Jim O'Rourke album) (Drag City, 1999)

With Portastatic
 De Mel, De Melão (Merge Records, 2000)

With Stereolab
 Dots and Loops (Duophonic Ultra High Frequency Disks, 1997)
 Sound-Dust (Duophonic Ultra High Frequency Disks, 2001)

With Superchunk
 Come Pick Me Up (Merge Records, 1999)

External links

Discographies of American artists
Jazz discographies